Dulo Hill (‘Halm Dulo’ \'h&lm 'du-lo\) is a rocky hill rising to  in Dospey Heights on Byers Peninsula of Livingston Island in the South Shetland Islands, Antarctica. It overlooks President Beaches to the south.

The feature is part of the Antarctic Specially Protected Area ASPA 126 Byers Peninsula, situated in one of its restricted zones.

The hill is named after the Bulgarian ruling dynasty of Dulo (7th–10th century).

Location

Maps
Península Byers, Isla Livingston. Mapa topográfico a escala 1:25000. Madrid: Servicio Geográfico del Ejército, 1992.
L.L. Ivanov et al. Antarctica: Livingston Island and Greenwich Island, South Shetland Islands. Scale 1:100000 topographic map. Sofia: Antarctic Place-names Commission of Bulgaria, 2005.
L.L. Ivanov. Antarctica: Livingston Island and Greenwich, Robert, Snow and Smith Islands. Scale 1:120000 topographic map.  Troyan: Manfred Wörner Foundation, 2009.

Notes

References
Dulo Hill. SCAR Composite Gazetteer of Antarctica.
 Bulgarian Antarctic Gazetteer. Antarctic Place-names Commission. (details in Bulgarian, basic data in English)

External links
 Dulo Hill. Copernix satellite image

Hills of Livingston Island
Bulgaria and the Antarctic